This is a list of Nintama Rantarō video games, which were published exclusively in Japan. Most of them were developed and published by Culture Brain.

Game Boy

 Nintama Rantarō GB - released December 27, 1995 - Culture Brain
 Puzzle Nintama Rantarō GB - released November 1, 1996 - Culture Brain
 Nintama Rantarō GB: Eawase Challenge Puzzle - released June 19, 1998 - Culture Brain

Game Boy Color

 Nintama Rantarō: Ninjutsu Gakuen ni Nyuugaku Shiyou no Dan - released March 23, 2001 - developed by Polygon Magic and published by ASK

Nintendo 64

 Nintama Rantarō 64 Game Gallery - released April 21, 2000 - Culture Brain

Nintendo DS

 Nintama Rantarō: Nintama no Tame no Ninjutsu Training - released March 26, 2009 - Russel
 Nintama Rantarō: Gakunen Taikousen Puzzle! no Dan - released September 2, 2010 - Russel

PC (Windows/Mac)

 Nintama Game Land - released September 12, 1997 - ASCII Something Good

Playdia

 Nintama Rantarō: Gungun no Biru Chinou-Hen - released April 22, 1996 - Bandai
 Nintama Rantarō: Hajimete Oberu Chishiki-Hen - released May 15, 1996 - Bandai

Sega Pico

 Nintama Rantarō

Super Famicom

 Nintama Rantarō - released July 28, 1995 - Culture Brain
 Nintama Rantarō 2 - released March 29, 1996 - Culture Brain
 BS Nintama Rantarō 2 - 1996 - Culture Brain
 Puzzle Nintama Rantarō - released June 28, 1996 - Culture Brain
 Nintama Rantarō Special - released August 9, 1996 - Culture Brain
 Nintama Rantarō 3 - released February 28, 1997 - Culture Brain

External links
 Nintama Rantarō at GameFAQs
 Nintama Rantarō (Super Famicom titles) at superfamicom.org

Bandai games
Culture Brain games
Japan-exclusive video games
Video games about ninja
Nintama Rantarō
Nintama Rantarō
Nintama Rantaro
Nintama Rantarō